Pharmaceutical Affairs Law or Pharmaceutical Affairs Act may refer to:
Pharmaceutical Affairs Law (Japan)
Pharmaceutical Affairs Law (South Korea)
Pharmaceutical Affairs Law (Taiwan)